André Joyal (born 1943) is a professor of mathematics at the Université du Québec à Montréal who works on category theory. He was a member of the School of Mathematics at the Institute for Advanced Study in 2013, where he was invited to join the Special Year on Univalent Foundations of Mathematics.

Research 

He discovered Kripke–Joyal semantics, the theory of combinatorial species and with Myles Tierney a generalization of the Galois theory of Alexander Grothendieck in the setup of locales. Most of his research is in some way related to category theory, higher category theory and their applications. He did some work on quasi-categories, after their invention by Michael Boardman and Rainer Vogt, in particular conjecturing  and proving the existence of a Quillen model structure on sSet whose weak equivalences generalize both equivalence of categories and Kan equivalence of spaces.  He co-authored the book "Algebraic Set Theory" with Ieke Moerdijk and recently started a web-based expositional project Joyal's CatLab  on categorical mathematics.

Personal life 
Joyal was born in Drummondville (formerly Saint-Majorique). He has three children and lives in Montreal.

Bibliography

; ; 

 André Joyal, Ieke Moerdijk, Algebraic set theory. London Mathematical Society Lecture Note Series 220. Cambridge Univ. Press 1995. viii+123 pp. 
 André Joyal, Myles Tierney, Notes on simplicial homotopy theory, CRM Barcelona, Jan 2008 pdf
 André Joyal, Disks, duality and theta-categories, preprint (1997) (contains an original definition of a weak n-category: for a short account see Leinster's , 10.2).

References

External links
Interview with André Joyal (in French)

Official Web page at UQAM

Living people
1943 births
Category theorists
20th-century Canadian mathematicians
21st-century Canadian mathematicians
Academic staff of the Université du Québec à Montréal
People from Drummondville